Noel Derrick (5 July 1926 – 25 December 2018) was an Australian ice hockey player who competed in the 1960 Winter Olympics.

References

1926 births
2018 deaths
Australian ice hockey left wingers
Olympic ice hockey players of Australia
Ice hockey players at the 1960 Winter Olympics
Sportspeople from Sydney
Sportsmen from New South Wales